Piccata describes meat, usually veal or chicken, that is sliced, dredged in flour, browned, and then served in a sauce containing lemon juice, butter, and capers.

Etymology
Piccata is an Italian word, the feminine form of the word piccato, meaning “larded.” It is also commonly spelled picatta or pichotta outside of Italy. The Italian culinary term means "to be pounded flat." When used in reference to a way of preparing food, particularly meat or fish, it means "sliced, sautéed, and served in a sauce containing lemon, butter, and spices."

All our research indicated that the dish originated in the United States in the 1930s. It appears to have been created by Italian immigrants, and it was originally prepared with veal (which during that period in history was much cheaper than chicken – imagine that). (frankiebones.com ) 

Traditionally, the American Italians use veal (veal piccata); however, the best-known dish in the US uses chicken (chicken piccata). The recipe has a meatless adaptation using seitan (seitan piccata). Piccata is also prepared using veal (piccata di vitello al limone) or frittura piccata, particularly in the Milanese region  swordfish (pesce spada con capperi e limone).

Preparation
A chicken breast is butterflied or sliced along its width. It is flattened to an even thickness with a tenderizer between two pieces of wax paper or plastic wrap. It is seasoned and dredged in flour before being browned in butter or olive oil. The sauce is made using pan drippings. Lemon juice and white wine or chicken stock are added and reduced. Shallots or garlic can be added with capers, chopped parsley, and slices of lemon. After reduction, butter is stirred in to finish the sauce. 

In the United States, it is usually served with a vegetable or starch, such as pasta, polenta, or rice. In Italy, veal piccata is a secondo and would be served after the pasta (or other starch) course.

See also
 Braciola
 Carne pizzaiola
 Chicken Française
 List of chicken dishes
 List of veal dishes
 Saltimbocca
 Scaloppine

References

External links 
 

American chicken dishes
Italian chicken dishes
Veal dishes